Hira Mosque is a mosque in Ichikawa, Chiba Prefecture, Japan.

History
In 1997, ICOJ established the mosque in Gyotoku, Ichikawa city of Chiba ken by purchasing a two-storey building which was a bar earlier. During 2003-2004 the mosque building was reconstructed looking at the need to increase the capacity as well as poor condition of the building due to the age of building. The new Hira Mosque has been built, with a capacity of over 200 persons.

Major activities
 Five times Salat daily
 Salat-ul-Jumma: Jumma prayers are offered. The khuthba (sermon) is bilingual, delivered in both English and Urdu.
 Salat ut Taraweeh and Iftar facility in Ramadan
 Qiyam ul Lail and Suhur facility in final ten days of Ramadan
 Dars of Quran on Saturday's in English & Urdu
 Monthly Dars of Hadeeth in Japanese language 
 Teaching of Quran (recitation/Hifz/Tajweed) to children
 Islamic education and English language training for children under Hira Islamic School
 Performing Nikah (marriage) and issuance of Marriage certificate
 Library of Islamic books in several languages including Arabic, English, Urdu, Japanese, Malay, Bengali, etc.
 Shahada & issuance of Shahada certificate
 Janazah & Ghusul of Mayyah (Bathing and Islamic funeral rituals of dead bodies)

References

External links

 

1997 establishments in Japan
Mosques completed in 1997
Mosques in Japan
Religious buildings and structures in Chiba Prefecture